Marty Leo Brown (born January 23, 1963) is an American former professional baseball player and manager. He is a former Major League Baseball third baseman who played for the Cincinnati Reds (1988–89) and Baltimore Orioles (1990). He is also the former manager of the Hiroshima Toyo Carp of Japan's Central League, where he played for three seasons from 1992 to 1994, and the Tohoku Rakuten Golden Eagles of the Pacific League.

Career
Brown was selected by the Cincinnati Reds in the 12th round of the 1985 Major League Baseball Draft. He reached the major leagues in 1988 and appeared in 35 games over two seasons with the Reds and one with the Baltimore Orioles, who had selected him in the Rule 5 Draft in winter 1989.

From 2001 to 2002, he managed the Nashville Sounds, a team for which he played while in the Reds organization in 1988 and 1989. Brown was the manager of the Buffalo Bisons from 2003 to 2005 with an overall record of 238–193 (.552). He led the team to the International League title in 2004 after a regular season record of 83-61. He also managed the club to a first-place finish in their division in 2005 with an 82–62 (.569) record. Brown was honored by the league by being voted the Manager of the Year in 2004, and was also named Minor League Manager of the Year by Baseball America.

Brown served as the manager of the Hiroshima Toyo Carp from 2006 to 2009, and the Tohoku Rakuten Golden Eagles in 2010. He signed a two-year managerial contract with the Eagles, however he was fired after only one last-place season.

Prior to the 2011 season he accepted the managerial position job for the Toronto Blue Jays Triple-A affiliate Las Vegas 51s.  He managed the 51s through the 2012 season.

On November 19, 2012, the Blue Jays announced that Brown would return as the manager of the Buffalo Bisons, now the Triple-A affiliate of the Blue Jays. On April 28, 2013, Brown notched his 254th victory as manager of the Bisons, the most wins of any manager in Bisons history. On August 11, 2013, Brown recorded his 300th victory as manager of the Bisons.

On December 20, 2013, the Blue Jays announced that Brown was leaving the organization.

Marty Brown is currently the Washington Nationals' director of Pacific Rim scouting.

References

External links

 http://www.baseballwifeblog.com/2010/06/baseball-wife-my-past-life.html
 http://brownsbaseballacademy.com

1963 births
Living people
Managers of baseball teams in Japan
Sportspeople from Lawton, Oklahoma
Cincinnati Reds players
Baltimore Orioles players
Georgia Bulldogs baseball players
Hiroshima Toyo Carp players
American expatriate baseball players in Japan
Major League Baseball third basemen
Nashville Sounds players
Buffalo Bisons (minor league) managers
Las Vegas 51s managers
Billings Mustangs players
Cedar Rapids Reds players
Nashville Sounds managers
Vermont Reds players
Colorado Springs Sky Sox players
Rochester Red Wings players
Oklahoma City 89ers players
Baseball players from Oklahoma
Expatriate baseball managers in Japan
Hiroshima Toyo Carp managers
Tohoku Rakuten Golden Eagles managers
Baseball coaches from Oklahoma
Altoona Curve managers
Mat-Su Miners players